Plenty Road is a major urban arterial road in the north-eastern suburbs of Melbourne, Victoria, Australia. Plenty Road begins at the intersection of High Street and Dundas Street in Preston, travelling through the north eastern suburbs of Reservoir, Bundoora, Mill Park, South Morang and Mernda and terminating in the township of Whittlesea, just outside the urban area of Melbourne.

The road is notorious amongst Melburnians as one of the most congested and dangerous roads in Melbourne, with the section in Bundoora near the M80 Ring Road carrying upwards of 60,000 vehicles per day. The AAMI Crash Index of 2020 listed it as the worst road in Australia. Numerous upgrades have occurred on the road over the years to improve the road, with the most recent upgrades between 2019 and 2021 upgrading a significant portion of the road and reducing a number of bottlenecks.

Route 
Plenty Road begins at the intersection of High Street and Dundas Street in Preston. Here it is a typical 4 lane single-carriageway inner suburban road, carrying the Route 86 tram line on the roadway. At the Albert Street intersection in Reservoir, it changes into a 6 lane divided road with speed limits varying between 60 km/h and 70 km/h, carrying the tram route within the median strip. Just north of the Metropolitan Ring Road interchange the tram route ends at Bundoora RMIT, which also provides access to the nearby Uni Hill Shopping Centre. North of here the road continues as a 6 lane divided road (as of the 2019 upgrade) with a speed limit of 80 km/h until just before Mernda, where the road reduces to 4 lanes. North of the Bridge Inn Road intersection in Mernda, the road again reduces to a 2 lane single carriageway with a speed limit of 100 km/h until it ends in the township of Whittlesea.

History
Plenty Road was signed as Metropolitan Route 27 between Preston and South Morang in 1965, then extended north all the way to Whittlesea along the entire route in 1989. With Victoria's conversion to the newer alphanumeric system in 1998, this was truncated back to the Gorge Road intersection in South Morang, with the road north of here replaced with the designation C727. In between 2019 and 2021, on the newly upgraded sections between McKimmies Road in Bundoora and Bridge Inn Road in Mernda, the road has been reassigned A51.

The passing of the Road Management Act 2004 granted the responsibility of overall management and development of Victoria's major arterial roads to VicRoads: in 2004, VicRoads re-declared the road as Plenty Valley Highway (Arterial #6140), beginning at the Albert Street and Boldrewood Parade intersection at Reservoir and ending at Metropolitan Ring Road in Bundoora, while re-declaring the remnants between Reservoir and Bell Street in Preston as Whittlesea Road (Arterial #5813), and between Bundoora and the intersection of Wallan Road and Macmeikan Street in Whittlesea as Main Whittlesea Road (Arterial #5814); the section of Plenty Road between Bell and High Streets in Preston remains undeclared. Despite the declared names, the road is still presently known (and signposted) as Plenty Road along its entire length.

Major works 
With the suburban growth since the late 1990s in the outer suburbs of Mill Park, South Morang and more recently Mernda, the road has become severely congested in recent years, with Plenty Road being one of the only major arterial roads in the area to a number of new estates. In the years since, the road has been progressively widened to 2 or 3 lanes each way, with the most recent upgrades in 2021 making the road a divided road all the way to Bridge Inn Road, Mernda. The Plenty Road upgrade between 2018 and 2021 upgraded a number of intersections and was completed in August 2021.

Major intersections

References 

Roads in Victoria (Australia)
Transport in the City of Whittlesea
Transport in the City of Banyule
Transport in the City of Darebin